Ryan Casey (born 3 January 1979) is a former professional footballer who played as left-back. Ryan was appointed as the FAI Development Officer for Sligo in July 2007. He spent most of his career with Swansea City. Born in England, he played for the Republic of Ireland U18 national team.

Career
Casey began his career with Swansea City having signed as a 17-year-old from Galway Hibernians A.F.C.

He has also played for St Patrick's Athletic, Cork City, Galway United, Athlone Town and Longford Town.

Casey was part of the so-called "golden generation" of Republic of Ireland youth football of the late 1990s. Under the guidance of Brian Kerr, the unfancied Republic won the UEFA U-16 and U-18 European championships in 1998, and Ryan was part of the victorious U-18 side in Cyprus. In 1999, he played at the World Youth Cup in Nigeria, where the Republic reached the last 16 before going out on penalties to the hosts.

Honours
Swansea City
Football League Third Division play-offs runner-up: 1997

Republic of Ireland
 UEFA European Under-18 Championship: 1998

United Kingdom
 Part of the Great Britain team in the 2000 Sydney Olympics

References

External links

Swansea City A.F.C. players
Athlone Town A.F.C. players
Galway United F.C. (1937–2011) players
St Patrick's Athletic F.C. players
Longford Town F.C. players
Melbourne Knights FC players
League of Ireland players
Living people
1979 births
English Football League players
Association football fullbacks
Republic of Ireland association footballers
English footballers
English people of Irish descent
Republic of Ireland youth international footballers